Cornelis Johannes DuPreez Strauss (born 7 June 1978) is a South African music director, TV, theatre and radio producer, composer, lyricist, writer, casting director, orchestra conductor and TV personality. He is mostly known for starring in the TV series SugaRushed and for conducting stage versions of Disney's The Lion King.

Education

Strauss was classically trained on the piano for 17 years. He passed cum laude the final piano examinations of both the University of South Africa and the Associated Board of the Royal Schools of Music (London, England). He completed his high school career with seven distinctions in Bloemfontein, South Africa. He was awarded Hennie Joubert Prize by the University of South Africa, given to the top music students in the country. Strauss holds two cum laude University Degrees: In Philosophy, Psychology, Art, History of Art, Communications and Languages. He was awarded Best Humanities Student from the University of the Free State.

In 2007, he moved to New York where he learned orchestra conducting at the Juilliard School of Music in New York City  from Maestro Vincent La Selva.

He is a lapsed member of Mensa, the organisation open to people who score at the 98th percentile or higher on a standardised, supervised IQ or other approved intelligence test. He is also an invited member of The Golden Key International Honour Society that recognises outstanding academic achievement and connects high-achieving individuals globally.

Career

Strauss was Music Director for the South African a cappella group Overtone
when they were discovered by Dina Eastwood. They went on to perform the soundtrack to Clint Eastwood's feature film Invictus (film).

Strauss has musically directed many full-scale theatre productions, including Sweeney Todd (FrenchWoods, New York City), South African Best New Musical 2003 award winner Mercury Rising, Big Top Burlesque, Somebody To Love, Jacques Brel Is Alive And Well And Living in Paris and Divas of Music and Dance. In addition, Strauss conducted Disney's The Lion King (musical) in South Africa (2008), Taiwan (2009) and Singapore (2011). He also worked with director Julie Taymor, Lebo M Garth Fagan on revising "The Lion King" for its 10th Anniversary production.

From 2012 - 2013, Strauss starred in SugaRushed, a reality soap about him and his music producer partner, Bradley Africa, running a record label. The series was aired on TopTV in South Africa and is currently on air in 11 other countries on the Zuku pay channel broadcaster.

Strauss composes regularly for TV, including The Heart is Beautiful, Robinson Regstreek, Spieelbeeld and Emily Hobhouse, as well as composing for his own show SugaRushed.

Strauss co-produced "Jacobsbaai", the first ever English-and-multi-African-language play in New York City, at the Cherry Lane Theatre. He co-produced and co-presented the "Outspoken" radio show, which broadcasts to all of Sub-Saharan Africa.

Strauss composed, performed and produced the song "Hidroponies" by his band "ZombieVampire", as well as directing the music video. The music video was in the official selection of the Out Twin Cities International Film Festival in Minneapolis in 2012.

Strauss has starred as TV actor in the South African soaps "Scandal" and "Villa Rosa" (2011) and the drama series "Intersexions", as well as actin in Canadian film director Bruce LaBruce's "X-Homes".

Strauss was one of the faces of Mustang Jeans and Underwear (2011 worldwide campaign) shot by Danish photographer Klaus Thymann.

He is a contributing writer, model, and one-time photoshoot director for Fashion TV Magazine.

Strauss has conducted The African Children's Choir who have performed with Mariah Carey, Bob Geldof, Paul McCartney, Wyclef Jean and Josh Groban. The choir has been featured on The Ellen DeGeneres Show.

Strauss has performed for the likes of Oprah Winfrey, Celine Dion, Elton John, Morgan Freeman, Clint Eastwood, Matt Damon and Nelson Mandela.

References

1978 births
Living people
Mensans
People from Pretoria
South African conductors (music)
South African television personalities
21st-century conductors (music)